Paco Underhill is an environmental psychologist, author, and the founder of  market research and consulting company  Envirosell. He employs the basic idea of environmental psychology, that our surroundings influence our behavior, to find ways of structuring man-made environments to make them conducive to retail purposes.

Early life and education
Underhill lived abroad as a child, as his father was a diplomat. Underhill is a 1975 graduate of Vassar College, Poughkeepsie, New York, United States.

Published works
Why We Buy: The Science of Shopping
Call of the Mall: The Geography of Shopping
What Women Want: The Global Marketplace Turns Female Friendly

References

Further reading

External links
 Envirosell

American business writers
Environmental psychologists
Living people
Vassar College alumni
Year of birth missing (living people)